Boumerdès is a town in Algeria.

Boumerdès may also refer to:
 Ouled Boumerdès is a village in Algeria.
 Zawiyet Ouled Boumerdès is a zawiya in Algeria.
 Boumerdès District is a district in Algeria.
 Boumerdès Province is a province in Algeria.
 RC Boumerdes is a football club in Algeria.
 List of people from Boumerdès Province is a list of people in Algeria.
 2003 Boumerdès earthquake is an earthquake in Algeria.

See also
Boumerdassi (disambiguation)